Unbehagen is the second studio album by Nina Hagen Band, released in 1979 by CBS Records. It is the last album released by the band, before Nina Hagen decided to pursue a solo career. The band kept on performing under the name Spliff.

The album produced three singles, "African Reggae", "Herrmann hiess er" and "Auf'm Rummel". "Herrmann hiess er" deals with drug addiction and is believed to be about Hagen's ex-boyfriend Herman Brood. An accompanying music video was also released. The album also contains a German cover version, "Wir leben immer... noch", of Lene Lovich's hit single "Lucky Number". The song "Wenn ich ein Junge wär" was recorded live in April 1979 at the Saarbrücken Congress Hall.

The album was a chart success and was certified Gold in Germany in 1981, selling over 250,000 copies.

Track listing

Personnel
Nina Hagen Band
Nina Hagen – vocals
Bernhard Potschka – guitar
Reinhold Heil – keyboards; bass synthesiser on "No Way"
Manfred Praeker – bass; rhythm guitar on "No Way"
Herwig Mitteregger – drums, percussion
Technical 
Ruiz & Carlier - artwork, design
Alain Bizos - photography

Charts

Year-end charts

Certifications

References

External links
[ Unbehagen] at Allmusic

1979 albums
Nina Hagen albums
CBS Records albums